Turais may refer to:
The traditional name for the star Iota Carinae
The traditional name for the star Rho Puppis